Speaker adaptation is an important technology to fine-tune either features or speech models for mis-match due to inter-speaker variation. In the last decade, eigenvoice (EV) speaker adaptation has been developed. It makes use of the prior knowledge of training speakers to provide a fast adaptation algorithm (in other words, only a small amount of adaptation data is needed). Inspired by the kernel eigenface idea in face recognition, kernel eigenvoice (KEV) is proposed. KEV is a non-linear generalization to EV. This incorporates Kernel principal component analysis, a non-linear version of Principal Component Analysis, to capture higher order correlations in order to further explore the speaker space and enhance recognition performance.

See also
 fMLLR

References

External links
Kernel Eigenvoice Speaker Adaptation, ScientificCommons

Speedup of Kernel Eigenvoice Speaker Adaptation by Embedded Kernel PCA, ICSLP 2004.
Speaker Adaptation via Composite Kernel PCA, NIPS 2003.

Kernel methods for machine learning